During World War II, the United States Army Air Forces (USAAF) established numerous airfields in Arizona for training pilots and aircrews of USAAF fighters and bombers.

Most of these airfields were under the command of Fourth Air Force or the Army Air Forces Training Command (AAFTC) (A predecessor of the current-day United States Air Force Air Education and Training Command).  However, the other USAAF support commands (Air Technical Service Command (ATSC); Air Transport Command (ATC) or Troop Carrier Command) commanded a significant number of airfields in a support roles.

It is still possible to find remnants of these wartime airfields. Many were converted into municipal airports, some were returned to agriculture and several were retained as United States Air Force installations and were front-line bases during the Cold War. Hundreds of the temporary buildings that were used survive today, and are being used for other purposes.

Major airfields
Air Transport Command
 Now: Coolidge Municipal Airport 
 Winslow Municipal Airport, Winslow
 Now: Winslow–Lindbergh Regional Airport 

Fourth Air Force
 Davis–Monthan Field, Tucson
 32nd Air Base Squadron / 32nd Base Headquarters and Air Base Squadron; 20 April 1941–1 April 1944
 233rd Army Air Force Base Unit (Combat Crew Training Station, Very Heavy)(Second AF); 1 April 1944–16 November 1945
 Now:  Davis–Monthan Air Force Base 
 Sahuarita Flight Strip  ( east of Sahuarita)
 Aux to Davis–Monthan AAF
 Now: S. Sahuarita Park Rd.

Air Technical Service Command
 Tucson Army Air Field, Tucson
 Joint Use USAAF/Civil Airport
 Now: Tucson International Airport  and  Tucson Air National Guard Base, home to the 162d Fighter Wing, Arizona Air National Guard

Civilian Pilot Training Program
 Ernest A. Love Field, Prescott
 Joint Use USAAF/USN/Civil Airport
 Now: Prescott Municipal Airport 

Army Air Forces Training Command
 Army Air Forces Advanced Flying School (Two Engine) / Army Air Forces Pilot School (Advanced, Two Engine) (West Coast AAF Training Center); October 1942–23 October 1945
 461st Base Headquarters and Air Base Squadron; 1 November 1942–30 April 1944
 3014th Army Air Force Base Unit; 1 May 1944–1 November 1945
 Now: Bisbee Douglas International Airport
 Auxiliary of Douglas Army Air Field
 Now: Airfield closed and abandoned
 Falcon Field Army Air Field, Mesa
 Western Flight Training Center
 Now: Falcon Field Airport 
 Army Air Forces Gunnery School/Army Air Forces Flexible Gunnery School; 4 August 1942–30 June 1945
 460th Base Headquarters and Air Base Squadron; 26 December 1942–30 April 1944
 3018th Army Air Forces Base Unit; 1 May 1944–30 June 1945
 Now: Kingman Airport and Industrial Park 
 Sub-base of Kingman Army Airfield
 Now: Chrysler Arizona Proving Ground (Non flying facility)

 Luke Field, Glendale
 Air Corps Advanced Flying School (Single Engine)/Army Air Forces Advanced Flying School (Single Engine)/AAF Pilot School (Advanced, Single Engine); 20 May 1941–4 July 1946
 66th Air Base Squadron/66th Base Headquarters and Air Base Squadron; 15 June 1941–30 April 1944
 3028th Army Air Forces Base Unit; 1 May 1944–30 November 1946
 Now:  Luke Air Force Base 
 Army Air Forces Advanced Flying School, Fixed Gunnery; 29 August 1942–15 December 1945
 472nd Base Headquarters and Air Base Squadron; 29 August 1942–30 April 1944
 3011th Army Air Forces Base Unit; 1 May 1944–15 December 1945
 Now: Eric Marcus Municipal Airport 
 Sub–base of Luke Army Airfield
 492nd Base Headquarters and Air Base Squadron; 25 January 1943–30 April 1944
 3029th Army Air Forces Base Unit; 1 May 1944–15 January 1945
 Now:  Gila Bend Air Force Auxiliary Field 

Army Air Forces Western Flying Training Command
 Army Air Forces Basic Flying School / Army Air Forces Pilot School (Basic); 8 July 1942–15 September 1945
 389th Base Headquarters and Air Base Squadron; 8 August 1942–30 April 1944
 3024th Army Air Forces Base Unit; 1 May 1944–1 November 1945
 Now: Pinal Airpark 
 Auxiliaries of Marana Army Air Field
 Marana Auxiliary Army Airfield No. 1, aka Picacho Field in Picacho
 Now:  Picacho Stagefield ARNG Heliport 
 Marana Auxiliary Army Airfield No. 2, aka Rillito Field in Marana
 Now: Marana Regional Airport 
 Marana Auxiliary Army Airfield No. 5, aka Sahuaro Field in Pima County
 Now: El Tiro Gliderport 
 Ryan Field, Tucson
 Contract Primary Flying Training; 25 June 1942–September 1944
 11th Army Air Forces Flying Training Detachment (Primary); 10 July 1942–30 April 1944
 3049th Army Air Forces Base Unit; 1 May 1944–September 1944
 Today: Ryan Field Airport 
 Thunderbird Field No. 1, Glendale
 Contract Primary Flying Training; 12 July 1941–1 May 1945
 Air Corps Training Detachment/6th Army Air Forces Flying Training Detachment (Primary); 12 July 1941–30 April 1944
 3040th Army Air Forces Base Unit; 1 May 1944–27 June 1945
 Now: Arizona Christian University (Non flying facility)

 Thunderbird Field No 2, Scottsdale
 Contract Primary Flying Training; 24 June 1942–16 October 1944
 12th Army Air Forces Flying Training Detachment (Primary); 10 July 1942–30 April 1944
 3048th Army Air Forces Base Unit; 1 May 1944–16 October 1944
 Now: Scottsdale Airport 
 Williams Field, Mesa
 Army Air Forces Advanced Flying School (Two Engine)/Army Air Forces Pilot School (Advanced, Two Engine); 26 June 1941–1 June 1948
 89th Air Base Squadron/89th Base Headquarters and Air Base Squadron; 4 December 1941–30 April 1944
 3010th Army Air Forces Base Unit/3010th Air Force Base Unit; 1 May 1944–28 August 1948
 Was:  Williams Air Force Base (1947–1993)
 Now: Phoenix–Mesa Gateway Airport 
Auxiliaries of Williams Air Force Base
 Williams Field Auxiliary No. 2 aka Rittenhouse Field in Queen Creek
 Now:  Rittenhouse Army Heliport 
 Williams Field Auxiliary No. 3 aka Casa Grande Field in Casa Grande.
 Today: Casa Grande Municipal Airport 
 Williams Auxiliary Airfield No. 5 aka Goodyear Auxiliary Airfield in Gila River Indian Reservation
 Now: Gila River Memorial Airport 
 AAF Advanced Flying School (Single Engine)/AAF Pilot School (Advanced Single Engine)/AAF Flexible Gunnery School/AAF Radar Observer School; September 1942–1 November 1945
 403rd Base Headquarters and Air Base Squadron; September 1942–30 April 1944
 3036th Army Air Forces Base Unit; 1 May 1944–1 November 1945
 Was: Vincent Air Force Base (1951–1959)
 Now:   Marine Corps Air Station Yuma 
 Sub-bases of Yuma Army Air Field
 Now: Airfield closed and abandoned
 Now:  Laguna Army Airfield 
 Yuma Auxiliary Army Airfield No. 1
 Now: Redeveloped as part of Fortuna Foothills
 Yuma Auxiliary Army Airfield No. 2
 Now: Marine Corps Air Station Yuma Auxiliary Airfield on the Barry M. Goldwater Air Force Range
 Yuma Auxiliary Army Airfield No. 3
 Now: Redeveloped as agricultural fields
 Now: Rolle Airfield 
 Yuma Auxiliary Army Airfield No. 5 in Wellton
 Now: Airfield closed and abandoned
 Now: Airfield closed and abandoned
 Yuma Auxiliary Army Airfield No. 7 in Stoval
 Now: training field on the Barry M. Goldwater Air Force Range

See also

 Arizona during World War II
 Echeverria Field

References

 Maurer, Maurer (1983). Air Force Combat Units Of World War II. Maxwell AFB, Alabama: Office of Air Force History. .
 Ravenstein, Charles A. (1984). Air Force Combat Wings Lineage and Honors Histories 1947–1977. Maxwell AFB, Alabama: Office of Air Force History. .
 Thole, Lou (1999). Forgotten Fields of America : World War II Bases and Training, Then and Now, Vol. 2.  Pictorial Histories Pub . 
 Military Airfields in World War II – Arizona
 Marana Arizona Airport History
 History of Ernest A. Love Field
 Abandoned & Little-Known Airfields

External links
 AerospaceArchaeology
 World War II Arizona Army Air Fields, Aircraft Wrecks and Internment Camps. Archived from the original on March 28, 2013. Retrieved September 26, 2012.

 01
World War II
World War II
Airfields of the United States Army Air Forces in the United States by state
United States World War II army airfields